Wilhelm Huberts (22 February 1938 – 4 March 2022), also known as Willi Huberts, was an Austrian footballer who played as a midfielder.

Club career
Huberts began his career in his hometown with ASK Voitsberg. From there he was transferred to Grazer AK, who got him to the Stadion an der Körösistraße in 1955. Through his immense technical skills and his scoring qualities he became a supporter's favourite in Graz.

When GAK played a couple of friendlies in New York in 1959, two of them against Real Madrid, it caused Huberts who was a midfielder, to finally convince New York Hungarians of the German American Soccer League to sign him in 1960. With this club he won National Challenge Cup (today Lamar Hunt U.S. Open Cup) in 1962.

In 1963 he went to Frankfurt in Germany. In this year the Bundesliga was founded and the Eagles from Hesse were a founding member. Huberts was one of only four foreign players in German pro football, and the only Austrian. In the 1960s team of Frankfurt he was a key player. With the jersey number 10 he scored 80 times for the boys from Main.

For the 1970–71 season he returned to Austria and joined Austria Wien and eventually his home club Grazer AK in 1971 and retired in 1975.

International career
Huberts was capped four times for the Austria national team between 1959 and 1960, scoring in his debut in a 2–0 win against Belgium.

With the club change to New York came travel limitations, he was no longer selected for Austria and even when he joined Eintracht Frankfurt he never played again for the national team due to the politics of the clubs not to release foreign players except for big tournaments.

Personal life
Huberts died on 4 March 2022, at the age of 84.

Honours 
New York Hungarians
 National Challenge Cup: 1962

Eintracht Frankfurt
 DFB-Pokal: runners-up 1963–64
 UEFA Intertoto Cup: 1966–67

Austria Wien
 Austrian Cup: 1971

References

External links
 Wilhelm Huberts at Austria Archive 
 Wilhelm Huberts at Fussballportal 
 
 

1938 births
2022 deaths
People from Voitsberg
Austrian footballers
Association football midfielders
Austria international footballers
Austrian Football Bundesliga players
German-American Soccer League players
Bundesliga players
Grazer AK players
Eintracht Frankfurt players
FK Austria Wien players
A.S. Roma players
Austrian football managers
Kapfenberger SV managers
LASK managers
DSV Leoben managers
Austrian expatriate footballers
Austrian expatriate sportspeople in Germany
Expatriate footballers in Germany
Austrian expatriate sportspeople in the United States
Expatriate soccer players in the United States
Austrian expatriate sportspeople in Italy
Expatriate footballers in Italy
Footballers from Styria